Sri Lanka is officially a Buddhist country, while Sri Lankan's practices a variety of religions. As of the 2012 census, 70.2% of Sri Lankans were Buddhists, 12.6% were Hindus, 9.7% were Muslims (mainly Sunni), 7.4% were Christians (mostly Catholics). Buddhism is declared as the State religion of Sri Lanka and has been given special privileges in the Sri Lankan constitution such as the government is bound for protection and fostering of Buddhist Dharma throughout the nation. However, the constitution also provides for freedom of religion and right to equality among all its citizens. In 2008 Sri Lanka was the third most religious country in the world  according to a Gallup poll, with 99% of Sri Lankans saying religion is an important part of their daily life.

Distribution of religious groups
The census 2001 covered 18 districts only. The district percentages shown are from 2001 census except where the numbers are italic, which are from 1981 census. Population movements have occurred after 1981, and accurate statistics did not exist for districts which were not covered in 2001 census until the 2011 census.

Religion by Province

Buddhism

Theravada Buddhism is the official religion of Sri Lanka, with about 70.2% of the country's population as followers. Arahath Mahinda, son of Indian Buddhist emperor Ashoka, led the mission to Sri Lanka in 246 BCE when he converted the Sri Lankan king, Devanampiya Tissa, to Buddhism. Arahath Sanghamitra, daughter of King Ashoka, brought a sapling of the Bodhi tree in Buddha Gaya to Sri Lanka. She also established the Order of Nuns in Sri Lanka. The Sapling of the Bodhi tree, known as Jaya Sri Maha Bodhi was planted in the Mahameghavana Park in Anuradhapura by the King Devanampiya Tissa.

From then on, the royal families had helped to encourage the spread of Buddhism, aiding Buddhist missionaries and building monasteries. Around 200 BCE, Buddhism became the official religion of Sri Lanka. The Sacred Tooth Relic was brought to Sri Lanka in 4th century by Prince Danta and Princess Hemamala. Sri Lanka has the longest continuous history of Buddhism of any Buddhist nation. During the periods of decline, the Sri Lankan monastic lineage was revived through contacts with Myanmar and Thailand. Later on, however, Hindu invasions and European colonial influences contributed to the decline of Buddhism in Sri Lanka.

But during the last period of the European colonial period and the post-colonial period, Buddhism has gained a growth in Sri Lanka. Buddhism was 61.57% in 1881 in Sri Lanka. Buddhism has increased to 70.2% in Sri Lanka when it's 2012.

In the mid 18th century the higher ordination of Buddhist monks known as Upasampada, which was defunct at the time, was revived with the help of Siamese Buddhist monks on the initiatives taken by Weliwita Sri Saranankara Thero during the reign of king Kirti Sri Rajasinha of Kandy. By the mid-19th century, Buddhist leaders such as Migettuwatte Gunananda Thera, Hikkaduwe Sri Sumangala Thera, Colonel Henry Steel Olcott and Anagarika Dharmapala started a successful national Buddhist movement for the revival of Buddhism in Sri Lanka.

Hinduism

Hindus make up 12.6% of Sri Lanka's population. The origins of the religion are linked to early Tamil immigration into the island since the Chola conquests in the 10th century or even earlier with the Saivite devotional movement that swept South India.

Hinduism in Sri Lanka is largely identified with the Tamil population and is concentrated in the Northern, Eastern and Central Provinces. The population declined since the 1981 census on account of Sri Lankan Tamil emigration overseas and the repatriation of 'Indian' Tamils.

A significant Hindu religious figure in Sri Lankan modern history is Satguru Siva Yogaswami of Jaffna. One of the mystics of the 20th century, Yogaswami was the official satguru and counseling sage of Lanka's several million Tamil Hindu population. The Ramakrishna Mission is somewhat active in the Amparai and Batticaloa districts while the Shaiva Siddhanta school of philosophy of Shaivism sect of Hinduism is prevalent in the North of Sri Lanka. Yogaswami belonged to the Shaiva Siddhanta and he was 161st head of the Nandinatha Sampradaya. The next person in the line of succession after Yogaswami was Sivaya Subramuniyaswami.

Islam 

By the 7th century, Arab traders had controlled much of the trade on the Indian Ocean, including that of Sri Lanka's. Many of these traders settled down in Sri Lanka, encouraging the spread of Islam. However, when the Portuguese arrived at Sri Lanka during the 16th century, many of the Arabs' Muslim descendants were persecuted, thus forcing them to migrate to the Central Highlands and to the east coast.

In modern times, Muslims in Sri Lanka have the Muslim Religious and Cultural Affairs Department, which was established in the 1980s to prevent the continual isolation of the Muslim community from the rest of Sri Lanka. Today, about 9.7% of Sri Lankans adhere to Islam; mostly from the Moor and Malay ethnic communities on the island.

Christianity

According to a Christian tradition, Christianity was introduced by Thomas the Apostle in Sri Lanka (as well as India) during the 1st century. The first evidence of Christianity in Sri Lanka is the account in the 6th-century Christian Topography, which says a community of Persian Nestorians lived on the island. The Anuradhapura cross, discovered in 1912, is probably a relic of this community. However, the population of Christians in Sri Lanka didn't dramatically increase until the arrival of Portuguese missionaries during the 15th century. In the 17th century, the Dutch took over Sri Lanka and Dutch missionaries were able to convert 21% of Sri Lanka's population to Christianity by 1622.

In 1796 the Dutch were displaced by the British and in 1802 Ceylon became a Crown colony. Anglican and other Protestant missionaries arrived at Sri Lanka during the early 19th century, when the British took control of Sri Lanka from the Dutch. Under British rule missionary work was undertaken by English societies: Baptist, Wesleyan Methodist, the CMS and SPG. The Salvation Army and Jehovah's Witnesses are also present in Sri Lanka.

The percentage of Christians has slowly declined from the height of 13% in 1891 they were 12.6% and numbered were 302,000. In 2012 they 7.4%.  By the 1980s, the population of Christians was mostly concentrated in the northwest of Sri Lanka and in the capital where they are 10% of the population. Of these Christians, over 80% are Roman Catholics while the rest are predominantly Anglicans, Methodists and other Protestants.

Baháʼí Faith
Adherents of the Baháʼí Faith have been present in Sri Lanka since 1949.  The first Baháʼí resident in Colombo was a physician from India, Dr. M.E. Lukmani.  Its population grew in the 1950s and by 1962, its first administrative body for the national level (the National Spiritual Assembly of the Baháʼís of Sri Lanka) was elected.

See also
 History of Sri Lanka
 Freedom of religion in Sri Lanka

References

External links
The Buddhist World
About.com-Religion in Sri Lanka